The International Journal of Communication is an open access peer-reviewed academic journal covering studies on communication. The editor-in-chief is  Larry Gross (USC Annenberg School for Communication and Journalism) and it is published by the USC Annenberg Press (University of Southern California). The journal was established in 2007 and is abstracted and indexed by the Social Sciences Citation Index, Current Contents/Social & Behavioral Sciences, and EBSCOhost.

The journal publishes continuously, posting articles as soon as they are accepted.

References

External links 

 

University of Southern California
Publications established in 2007
English-language journals
Creative Commons-licensed journals
Communication journals